DSV-4 (formerly known as Sea Cliff) is a 25-ton, crewed deep-ocean research submersible owned by the United States Navy, now known only by its hull number, not by its former name.

DSV-4 is an Alvin-class deep submergence vehicle (DSV), a sister ship to Turtle (DSV-3), Alvin (DSV-2). The Alvin-class DSVs were designed to replace older DSVs, such as the less-maneuverable Trieste-class bathyscaphes.  Sea Cliff was built by Electric Boat in Groton, Connecticut for the U.S. Navy and was completed in December 1968. It spent much of its service life on loan to the Woods Hole Oceanographic Institution.

With the refit of DSV-4, the bathyscaphe DSV-1 (formerly known as Trieste II) was retired from service.

In 1985 the Sea Cliff made a record dive for this vessel type by diving 20,000 feet off Guatemala's Pacific Coast. The crew of the dive consisted of pilot Lt. Alan Mason and co-pilot Chief Petty Officer David Atchinson. From late September to early October 1990, over a course of 6 days, DSV-4 recovered the cargo door of United Airlines Flight 811 from the Pacific Ocean.

DSV-4 has a plug hatch  in diameter, held in place mechanically with hatch dogs and, while submerged, by the pressure of the water above it.

Sea Cliff was retired from active service in 1998 and subsequently given to Woods Hole Oceanographic Institution (WHOI). The Naval Vessel Register shows DSV-4 was returned to active U.S. Navy service on 30 September 2002 in the custody of WHOI, but an article in The New York Times indicates that it was cannibalized for parts for Alvin.

Awards
Meritorious Unit Citation with three stars
Navy E Ribbon (2 awards)
National Defense Service Medal with two stars
Global War on Terrorism Service Medal

See also

References
 *

External links
 Deep Submergence Vehicles article at the Federation of American Scientists web page

 

Sea Cliff
Research submarines of the United States
1968 ships